Oscar Selele Ntwagae  (22 July 1977, in Brakpan, Gauteng – 27 August 2010, in Germiston, Gauteng) was a South African association football defender for Premier Soccer League club Platinum Stars.

Platinum Stars had confirmed before his death that he had just rejoined the club on a three-year deal.

The 31-year-old left Stars for Mamelodi Sundowns in 2005 and spent three seasons with The Brazilians before joining city rivals SuperSport United in the off-season.

Ntwagae was killed on 27 August 2010 after being knocked down by a car in Germiston after coming back from Jomo Cosmos training where he was attending trials.

References

1977 births
2010 deaths
People from Brakpan
Road incident deaths in South Africa
South African soccer players
South Africa international soccer players
Mamelodi Sundowns F.C. players
Association football defenders
Pedestrian road incident deaths
Sportspeople from Gauteng